Three Days to Never is a 2006 fantasy novel by Tim Powers. As with most of Powers' novels, it proposes a secret history in which real events have supernatural causes and prominent historical figures have been involved in supernatural or occult activities.  The novel was shortlisted for the Locus Fantasy Award in 2007 as well as the Mythopoeic Fantasy Award for Adult Literature in the same year.

Plot 
The action mostly takes place in Southern California, in a few days during August 1987.

Frank Marrity (a widower) and his loving twelve-year-old daughter, Daphne, are drawn into a dangerous occult world when his grandmother (affectionately called "Grammar") dies in bizarre circumstances. Soon, Frank and Daphne are pursued by agents who know much more about their lives than they do—for example, that Grammar is Lieserl Maric, the daughter of Albert Einstein, and that she was friends with Charlie Chaplin—and that all three of them had discovered secrets to time travel and had found how to change prior events, perhaps to please themselves.

Frank and Daphne, who wish to live their normal lives (he teaches English at University of Redlands, she is also fond of English literature), find their lives invaded by secret agents and an old man who introduces himself to Frank as his missing father. In reality, he is an older Frank, from the year 2006, who has found himself in a miserable alcoholic life, but remembers an earlier time-line in which he was happy. Because Daphne died in that time-line, old Frank thinks that if she dies now, he will return to 2006's happy life.

Lieserl "Grammar" Marrity, with the help of her father Einstein and her friend Chaplin, had created a time machine (a "maschinchen"), which she keeps in a small outbuilding called the Kaleidoscope Shed. The machine's components are a swastika of gold filaments; a (fictional) cement slab with Chaplin's handprints, footprints and signature, dated 1928, from the forecourt of the Grauman's Chinese Theatre; a videotape of A Woman of the Sea, a lost film Chaplin made in 1926; and a pack of letters from Einstein to Grammar. The time machine, as described, works mystically as well as scientifically. This sort of synthesis of modes of speculative fiction (and of MacGuffins) is typical of Powers's combined-science-fiction-and-fantasy novels.

The Chaplin film has been recorded over a commercial VHS tape of Pee-wee's Big Adventure; when Daphne watches it, she reacts with such horror and fear that she strikes out pyrokinetically and burns both the tape and her teddy bear in her bedroom upstairs. This psychic action attracts the attention of two groups of foreign agents who are searching for the time machine.

The apparently sympathetic agents are of the Mossad, one member of whom wishes to travel back in time to change certain events during the Six-Day War, which left him crippled, whereas an opposing group, called the Vespers, wants to murder Frank Marrity for reasons he cannot understand.

Old Frank warns young Frank and Daphne not to eat in an Italian restaurant, but they disregard this and go to lunch at Alfredo's. Daphne chokes on a bite of food and Frank performs an emergency tracheotomy, saving her life. When she is hospitalized, they are visited by Oren Lepidopt, a Mossad katsa, who pretends to be Eugene Jackson of the National Security Agency. While there, he sees a dybbuk appear on the hospital room television and attempt to possess Daphne, but Lepidopt rescues them. Believing his statements, Frank and Daphne, by default, join the Mossad team.

The Vespers attempt to kidnap the Marritys by co-opting Frank's brother-in-law, Bennett, to deliver them for $50,000. Bennett leads them to Grammar's house, but then changes his mind and saves Frank and Daphne from assassination. Bennett brings Frank, Daphne, and his wife Moira (Frank's sister) to a house in Hollywood Hills. Frank contacts Lepidopt and tells him how to find the maschinchen in Grammar's Kaleidoscope Shed. By a matter of minutes, Lepidopt's team fetches the machine before the Vespers and old Frank can get to it.

In Hollywood Hills, the Vespers group successfully kidnaps Daphne, at which point one of them, Charlotte Sinclair, a blind psychic, switches sides and joins Frank to save Daphne. Having lost her eyesight in an accident at the age of 19, she wants the time travel machine in order to cancel her present time-line and start over, avoiding both the accident and her conflicted present life. She and Frank are romantically attracted to each other.

The Vespers bring Daphne to their hideout in Palm Springs. The Mossad team, with young Frank and Charlotte, bring the time machine components to the Wigwam Motel in San Bernardino, California in order to use it as an aid for a séance, each of them hoping to accomplish their various goals. They experience a sort of hallucination of Powers's fanciful history of what "really" happened to Einstein, Chaplin and Lieserl during the 1920s and 1930s, including a psychic/time travel explanation of the 1933 Long Beach earthquake.

Daphne, captured and tied up by the Vespers, uses her mental powers to set their headquarters on fire. They tranquilize her and flee, but Frank's telepathic link has alerted him to what she did. The Mossad agents imprison Frank and Charlotte in the back of their van and head for Palm Springs, where Lepidopt is intended to time-travel to the Six-Day War; both teams, using different magical abilities, gradually converge upon each other. Lepidopt, with his hands on the Chaplin concrete slab, hesitates, and the Vespers surround the Mossad van.

The novel climaxes with a shootout at the El Mirador Medical Plaza in Palm Springs, in which several major characters are shot and killed. Lepidopt finally gets up the nerve to "jump" but travels back only two minutes in time; still, this is enough for him to change the time-line and to save Frank, Daphne and Charlotte, though he himself dies. The details are wrapped up in the Epilogue, when the three attend Grammar's funeral. Bennett Bradley shares the $50,000 with the Marritys.

Characters

The Marrity Family 
 Lieserl Maric (1902-1987) - The daughter of Albert Einstein, she renamed herself from the Serbian "Lieserl Maric" to the Irish-sounding "Lisa Marrity." Mother of Derek Marrity, grand mother of Frank and Moira Marrity, and great grand mother of Daphne Marrity. Although she is found dead in the Prologue (having teleported to Mount Shasta during the Harmonic Convergence of August, 1987), her past actions, specifically devising the time machine, affect the rest of the novel.
 (Young) Frank Marrity (b. 1952) - The 35-year-old protagonist, he is an English professor and is devoted to his daughter, with whom he sometimes has telepathic contact. He falls in love with Charlotte Sinclair, despite the fact that she was commissioned to kill him.
 Daphne Marrity (b. 1975) - Frank's precocious 12-year-old daughter, she has the occasional power of pyrokinesis and is called a poltergeist by some characters. In an alternate time-line, she became an alcoholic living in a household of mutual hate with her father, and backed a car over him, causing him chronic pain in his leg. In the 1987 timestream of the novel, she loves him.
 (Old) Frank Marrity (b. 1952) - Having time-traveled from 2006 to 1987, his goal is to save his younger self from a life of misery. Old Frank remembers two time-lines; Life (A), in which Daphne died, but Frank went on to remarry and have a happy, successful life, and Life (B), in which Daphne survived and they lived together in a trailer park as hateful alcoholics. He teams up with the Vespers to re-arrange the world so that Daphne never existed, and so that he can return to Life (A).
 Moira Marrity Bradley - Frank's younger sister, married to Bennett Bradley.
 Bennett Bradley - A movie location scout, he is a bit money-hungry and resentful of Frank, but eventually sides with Frank and Daphne against the Vespers.
 Derek Marrity - Murdered by the Vespers in 1955, he was thought by his children to have abandoned them. His mummified head travels with the Vespers in their bus and can answer certain questions by whispering or via a Ouija board.

The Mossad team 
 Oren Lepidopt - A 40-year-old katsa of the Mossad, he has a bizarre handicap: at times, he is given an out-of-nowhere conviction that an action he has just performed is an event which he will never experience again, or he will die. (These actions include touching the Western Wall, petting a cat, hearing a telephone ring, and eating a tuna sandwich.) His goal is to get the time machine in order to fix certain events in the Six-Day War of 1967. He loves his young son, Louis, and sometimes hesitates in the course of action because he worries what the effects on Louis might be.
 Ernie Bozzaris - A 28-year-old member of the Mossad; he is shot to death by Paul Golze.
 Bert Malk - Another Mossad agent.
 Sam Glatzer - A "remote viewer," that is, a psychic who can eavesdrop on conversations many miles away; after reporting to the team a conversation between Frank and Daphne, and the fact of her pyrokinesis, he dies.
 Aryeh Mishal - An elderly agent who enters the novel quite late, to fix the mission that, in his view, Lepidopt has messed up.

The Vespers 
The Vespers are "a secret survival of the true Albigenses, the twelfth-century natural philosophers of Languedoc whose discoveries in the areas of time and so-called reincarnation had so alarmed the Catholic Church that Pope Innocent III had ordered the entire group to be wiped out." They have discovered the Holy Grail, and hope to use it as a component of time travel; in the twentieth century, they worked with Adolf Hitler's Nazi government in order to get funding, though not for any political reasons. They often travel as a group in a black bus.

 Denis Rascasse - A Frenchman, he is leader of the team hunting for the time machine in the United States. He is able to astrally project, and when he is shot, halfway through the novel, while literally hovering close to death, he is still able to communicate with his team and give them orders.
 Paul Golze - A sort of lieutenant to Rascasse, he deals with Old Frank, promising him a deal in return for an explanation of how to find and use the time machine.
 Charlotte Sinclair - Blinded by an accident at the age of 19, she is able, psychically, to see through the eyes of anyone near her. Her wish is to have her life "negated" and to return to her childhood, so that she can avoid the accident and her unhappy life. A heavy drinker. Late in the novel, she leaves the Vespers to work with the Mossad and falls in love with Frank Marrity.
 Roger Canino - Vespers security chief at their compound in Amboy, California.

Critical reception 
Science fiction author James K. Morrow, reviewing the novel for The Washington Post, admired Powers's "brio, bravado and a salutary measure of lunacy" in writing the book, and called it "a beguiling genre omelet, a mélange of forms ranging from alternate history to science fiction, urban fantasy to occult cliffhanger, espionage adventure to Ross Macdonald-style Southern California hardboiled detective thriller."

John Clute writes that the novel is a somewhat farcical "12-step to daylight" in which, happily, "Life is a game which can be played": "In this sounding house of story, a typical Tim Powers plot unfolds. As usual, there is no simple way to do synopsis: Not only are there two opposing Covert Forces attempting to gain control of the Grail-like MacGuffin, which does in the end change the world a few times before evaporating, but the central premise involves time travel, which can never be explained, not really.
... A certain proportion of Three Days is spent perplexing lay readers with exegeses of the theological and practical implications of Einstein's discovery, the time travel maschinchen he concealed after the 1933 disaster..." Clute says that the novel is not exactly clear, yet "the book ends in peace and closure, and it gives joy."

Andrew Santella wrote for The New York Times, "Powers's latest genre-blending thriller (call it an occult/fantasy/espionage/existential adventure with elements of paranoid rant) concerns shadowy groups of international intriguers racing to locate a lost discovery of Albert Einstein's that could quite literally change history. ... Frank Marrity, an English professor, and his 12-year-old daughter, Daphne, stumble on Einstein's secret and scramble to figure out what it means and how to keep it and themselves out of the hands of the mysterious groups—Mossad? the N.S.A.? Evil cabalists?—who are chasing them. Their predicament is about as dire as can be imagined, but it gives Powers's heroes the opportunity to confront their own pasts. You might finish this overstuffed novel still unsure about the connection between Einstein and astral projection, but if you give in to Powers's imaginative leaps and relentless pacing you may find that a mere quibble."

Adam B. Vary of Entertainment Weekly, in a mini-review, gave the novel a B+ grade: "In 1987, a widower dad and his young daughter are thrust into international metaphysical intrigue involving time travel, Jewish mysticism, and Albert Einstein. ... Deeply weird—Charlie Chaplin plays a key role—but it all somehow works in Powers' wily storytelling logic."

Comparing parts of the novel to C. S. Lewis's That Hideous Strength, Madeleine L'Engle's A Wrinkle in Time, and the writings of John le Carré, Graham Greene and Len Deighton, science fiction author John Shirley wrote, "The ride we take in this marvelous novel is glorious and gripping. And if we have a mind-bending panoply of the fantastic to absorb, we feel privileged to pay the price of entry—we accept it all as being part of the 'physics of the metaphysics' of the grimly glorious Powers universe."

Thomas M. Wagner of SFReviews.net, praising "Powers' creative brilliance," wrote, "Powers ingeniously imagines a world in which the most cutting-edge discoveries of physics walk hand in hand with paranormal phenomena, Kabbalist mysticism, and enough weirdness for any five seasons of The X-Files. ... If one were to glean a message from this story, it could be that, as much as we might dream of going back and changing events in our past that have hurt us to one degree or another, the point of life is to move forward through the pain, and not linger on it, tormenting ourselves by never learning lessons or growing as people. A lot of time travel thrillers would root themselves in the gizmo or the gimmick; Three Days to Never is that rare kind of thriller that never loses sight of the humanity beneath the surface."

Trivia 
 Grammar Marrity's house is located at 204 Batsford Street in Pasadena. Tim Powers's wife Serena's maiden name was Batsford.
 In Powers's novels, characters are frequently well acquainted with literature and deliver quotes often in dialogue. In this case, William Shakespeare's The Tempest is the chief literary source.

References

External links
 "The Power of Historical Fantasy: Tim Powers speaks to UCR" Published by University of California, Riverside's Highlander
 Interview with Tim Powers
 Three Days to Never at Worlds Without End
 Book Review at SF Reviews

2006 American novels
American fantasy novels
Novels about time travel
Novels by Tim Powers
Secret histories
Subterranean Press books